Emilio Botín-Sanz de Sautuola López (18 January 1903 – 22 September 1993) was a Spanish banker, the chairman of Santander Group from 1950 to 1986.

He was born in 1903, the son of Emilio Botín López and María Sanz de Sautuola y Escalante.

He was chairman of Santander from 1950 to 1986.

He was married to Ana García de los Ríos y Caller.

He was the father of Emilio Botín (1934–2014)  and Jaime Botín.

References

1903 births
1993 deaths
People from Santander, Spain
Businesspeople from Cantabria
Spanish bankers
Members of the Board of Directors of the Banco Santander